Sergio Leone: The Italian Who Invented America is a 2022 Italian documentary film written and directed by Francesco Zippel. A portrait of the art and the legacy of Sergio Leone through archive footage and interviews with collaborators and artists who were influenced by his style, it premiered in the Venice Classics section at the 79th edition of the Venice Film Festival.

Cast
 
 Sergio Leone (archive footage)
 Dario Argento
 Darren Aronofsky 
 Jacques Audiard
 Damien Chazelle
 Jennifer Connelly 
 Robert De Niro
 Clint Eastwood
 Christopher Frayling
 Tsui Hark
 Arnon Milchan
 Frank Miller
 Giuliano Montaldo
 Ennio Morricone
 Martin Scorsese
 Steven Spielberg
 Quentin Tarantino
 Giuseppe Tornatore
 Carlo Verdone
 Eli Wallach (archive footage)

Reception
The film won the 2023 Nastro d'Argento for Best Documentary.

References

External links
 

 

 
2022 documentary films
Italian documentary films
Documentary films about film directors and producers
Sergio Leone